In geometry, the octagonal tiling is a regular tiling of the hyperbolic plane. It is represented by Schläfli symbol of {8,3}, having three regular octagons around each vertex. It also has a construction as a truncated order-8 square tiling, t{4,8}.

Uniform colorings 
Like the hexagonal tiling of the Euclidean plane, there are 3 uniform colorings of this hyperbolic tiling. The dual tiling V8.8.8 represents the fundamental domains of [(4,4,4)] symmetry.

Regular maps
The regular map {8,3}2,0 can be seen as a 6-coloring of the {8,3} hyperbolic tiling. Within the regular map, octagons of the same color are considered the same face shown in multiple locations. The 2,0 subscripts show the same color will repeat by moving 2 steps in a straight direction following opposite edges. This regular map also has a representation as a double covering of a cube, represented by Schläfli symbol {8/2,3}, with 6 octagonal faces, double wrapped {8/2}, with 24 edges, and 16 vertices. It was described by Branko Grünbaum in his 2003 paper Are Your Polyhedra
the Same as My Polyhedra?

Related polyhedra and tilings 

This tiling is topologically part of sequence of regular polyhedra and tilings with Schläfli symbol {n,3}.

And also is topologically part of sequence of regular tilings with Schläfli symbol {8,n}.

From a Wythoff construction there are ten hyperbolic uniform tilings that can be based from the regular octagonal tiling. 

Drawing the tiles colored as red on the original faces, yellow at the original vertices, and blue along the original edges, there are 10 forms.

See also

Tilings of regular polygons
List of uniform planar tilings
List of regular polytopes

References

 John H. Conway, Heidi Burgiel, Chaim Goodman-Strauss, The Symmetries of Things 2008,  (Chapter 19, The Hyperbolic Archimedean Tessellations)

External links 

 Hyperbolic and Spherical Tiling Gallery
 KaleidoTile 3: Educational software to create spherical, planar and hyperbolic tilings
 Hyperbolic Planar Tessellations, Don Hatch

Hyperbolic tilings
Isogonal tilings
Isohedral tilings
Regular tilings